Vladimir Naglič (1896 – 1966) was a Slovene mariner and translator, known for his contribution to a Slovene Nautical Dictionary published in 1961 in cooperation with Janez Gradišnik and contributor of nautical terms to the Dictionary of Slovene Literary Language.

In 1951 he won the Levstik Award for his book Kratke zanimivosti iz pomorstva (Interesting Facts about Seafaring). He also translated into Slovene a number of books related to seafaring and other subjects, both fiction and non-fiction, such as Ivan Yefremov's Stellar Ships, 1956, Frans G. Bengtsson's The Long Ships, 1960, Frank Thiess' The Voyage of Forgotten Men, 1961, and Bertrand Russell's Common Sense and Nuclear Warfare, 1961.

References 

1896 births
1966 deaths
Slovenian translators
Levstik Award laureates
20th-century translators